The Children with the Golden Locks (German: Die Kinder mit dem Goldschopf) is a Georgian folktale. It is classified in the international Aarne-Thompson-Uther Index as type ATU 707, "The Three Golden Children".

Summary
A widowed man remarries. His new wife convinces him to abandon his three daughters. The father draws the three girls to the woods under the pretence of gathering apples. The man digs up a hole in the ground and covers it with a sheet. He climbs up the tree and beckons his daughters to come near the apple tree. The three sisters fall into the hole, and their father returns home.

Deep in the hole, they begin to feel hungry and the elder and middle sisters offer themselves to the others. The youngest, however, prays to God for an answer and her hands turn into a pickaxe and a spade. She excavates an exit out of the hole and reaches the king's stables. She steals the horses' fodder of almonds and raisins and takes them back to her sisters. One day, the horse groom notices that the horses are looking emaciated and investigates the matter. He discovers the girl stealing the horses' food and alerts the king.

The horse groom takes the three sisters to the king's court, who inquires them about their skills: the eldest claims she can weave a large carpet to accommodate the whole kingdom and then some; the middle one that she can cook a meal in an egg-shell for the whole kingdom, and the third sister promises to give birth to twin children, a boy and a girl with golden locks ("Goldschopf", in Dirr's text). The king marries the third sister and she gives birth to twins, but her jealous sisters replace the children for puppies and cast them in the sea in a box. The king then orders his wife to be bound in the castle gates, and for citizens to spit at and throw soot at her.

The box with the twins is found by a miller, who adopts and raises them as his own. Years laters, when the boy and the girl are grown up, the king invites the mothers and matrons of his kingdom for a feast. The miller takes the children to the feast and pass by the woman at the gate. The boy and the girl give her roses, wipe the soot off her body and kiss her. They join the feast and tell the guests that the woman at the gate is their mother. The king refuses to believe the two, until the boy produces a branch of dried vine. The boy then proclaims that the dried vine will spring to life and yield grapes, and that a roasted pheasant will come to life, perch on the branch and spread its wings. It happens so, thus proving their parentage. The king embraces his children, reinstates his wife and punishes the sisters-in-law.

Source
 stated that the source of this tale was the publication "Thedo Razikašvili, Xalxuri zγaprebi, Kaxet'sa da P'šavši šekrebuli", published in Tiflis in 1909.

Analysis

Tale type
The tale is classified in the Georgian folktale index as tale type ATU 707, "Wonderful Children" (or "The Three Golden Children", in the international index). According to the Georgian folktale index, the children are born with golden hair and, years later, a "beautiful maiden" reveals the truth to the king.

Georgian scholarship also states that the "starting episode" of Georgian variants is another tale type, indexed as -480G*, "Stepmother and Stepdaughter": a man remarries and his new wife orders him to abandon his daughters in the woods; they fall into a hole, but dig a way out to the king's stables.

Variants

Georgia
In The Three Sisters and their Stepmother, published by author Marjory Scott Wardrop, a widowed man with three daughters remarries. His new wife orders her husband to get rid of them. The man goes to the forest and digs a hole under an apple tree. He lures his daughters and they fall in the hole. Down in the hole, the youngest sister prays to God for a way out and her hands become a shovel and pickaxe. They dig an exit to the king's stables and eat almonds and raisins. The horse groom catches them one day and takes them to the king. The king inquires each of them about their skills: the youngest says she will bear two golden-haired boys. The truth is told by one of the brothers during a banquet with the king.

Azerbaijan
In an Azeri tale, "Продавец шиповника" ("The Wild Rose Seller"), an old man sells wild roses for a living for him and his three daughters. He remarries. One day, his new wife tells him that his earnings are not enough for the whole family, and issues an ultimatum for him: either he stays with his three daughters and she leaves, or he stays with her and abandons his three daughters. He chooses the second option. The man goes to the market to buy some apples, while the stepmother covers up a well with grass. The man brings home the apples and the daughters ask where he got them. The stepmother tricks the girls to go outside. They fall into the well and the man leaves them there. Some time later, the girls begin to feel hungry and decide to eat the one who jumps the lowest. Every time, it is the youngest sister who does. However, they find some raisins on the ground to sate their hunger. After three days, they decide to excavate their way out of the well and discover where the raisins are coming from: the king's stables. They enter it to forage for more food from the horses. The king notices something wrong with the horses and investigates. He discovers the three girls and inquires about their skills: the eldest promises to weave a large carpet where the royal army would sit and there would still be space left; the middle sister that she can cook food for the while army in an egg shell; the youngest that she can bear twins, a boy and a girl with hair with a half of gold and a half of silver. The king marries all three sisters; the elder two fail in their boasts, while the youngest bears the twins, who are cast in the water and saved by a miller. Years later, the king meets his twins and takes them to dinner, where the whole truth is revealed.

Dagestan
In a variant from Dagestan, "Три сестры" ("Three Sisters"), a man loses his wife. His three daughters convince their father to marry their neighbour. The woman becomes their step-mother, but, after some time, she convinces her husband to abandon the girls in the woods. The man goes to the market, buys some ambar beads and goes to the woods to dig a up hole. He throws the beads into the hole and draws his daughtes to the hole. They fall into the hole and the father covers the hole with a large rock. The sisters wish for their hands to become a shovel, a pickaxe and a spade, and begin excavating an exit. They reach the king's stable and hide under its roof, while one of them descends to get dates for the others. Time passes, and the king notices that his horses haven't been eating properly and sends his three sons to investigate. The two elders sleep on the job, but the youngest prince discovers the third girl, the prettiest of the sisters, who has been stealing the food. The king marries his three sons to the three women. The youngest gives birth to twins, a boy and a girl, with golden hair, but her sisters cast them in a box in the water. The twins are saved by an old woman. Years later, she takes them to a king's celebration. He notices the children and asks the old woman about them, then discovers they are his son and daughter.

Ossetia
In an Ossetian variant published by Ossetian-Russian folklorist  with the title "Своевольная кривобокая девица Каскатина" (German: Das eigensinnige krumme Mädchen Kaskatina; English: "Maiden Kaskatina"), on her deathbed, a wife warns her husband not to marry a woman of certain aspect. He becomes a widower and his three daughters insist he remarries. He finds a woman just like his late wife warned him about and declines her proposal. The woman dyes her hair and tricks the man into marrying her. After the wedding, she begins to poison the father against the daughters. One day, he comes home with fine looking apples and their daughters ask where he found them. The man takes the three girls to the woods and draws them to a hole with a pile of apples. The girls fall into the hole and their father goes home. The three sisters pray to their deities for their fingers to become shovels and spades, so that they can excavate an exit out of the hole. They dig a way to the khan's mill, where they begin to live, sing and dance. Their activities draw the court and the khan's attention, who finds the trio. He inquires about their skills: the eldest claims to be able to weave a hundred felts from one bundle of wool, the middle that she can cook a meal for a hundred people with a single egg, and the youngest says she will bear him golden-haired twins, a boy and a girl. The khan marries the youngest and she gives birth to the golden-haired twin, but her sisters place them in a box and cast them in the river. The box washes ashore and the children live by themselves by the river bank. When they are older, their aunts convince the female twin to ask her brother to build an iron tower deep within the dark forest. After the tower is built, the midwife visits them and tells the girl to get a music-producing furcoat, a magical mirror (looking glass) and a girl named Kaskatina, who possesses magical petrifying powers. The brother fails to get Kaskatina; the sister saves him and brings Kaskatina with them. Kaskatina marries the male twin.

In another Ossetian tale, "Ӕрхуы мӕсыджы бадӕг бурчызг" or "Бронзовая девушка Медной башни" (French: "La fille blonde qui se tient dans la tour de cuivre", English: "The blond girl at the tower of copper"), a widowed man marries a woman that wants his three daughters to be abandoned in the woods. He leads them to a tree with bright red fruits and throws them in a pit. The three girls pray for salvation, and three shovels and pickaxes appear. They use the tools to excavate an exit to the prince's mill, where they rest and eat food. One day, the prince finds the three sisters and inquires about their abilities: the elder says she can stich many types of footwear with only a quarter of leather; the second that she can prepare a great meal with a handful of flour, and the last that she can bear twins, a boy with golden hair and a girl with silver tresses. The king chooses the third girl as his wife, and takes the other two to live at the castle with them. Jealousy burning at their hearts, the two elder sisters take the children as soon as they are born and abandon them in the woods, to be suckled by a she-dog. As they grow up, they build a makeshift hut to house themselves and the she-dog; the sister stays at home and the brother hunts. One day, the two aunts visit them and convince the pair to seek a woman with blond hair that lives in a tower of copper. The boy takes his talking horse and gets the girl. The next day, their hut becomes a mansion of copper, with a tower of copper. Next, the two aunts convince them to look for a fur coat ("pelisse") stamped with a sun on the plastron and a moon on the back, and that produces music and sings.

In another Ossetian tale collected by philologist Bernhard Munkácsi, Ärtʼä čəˈzʒə āˈrɤau, and translated as Märchen von den drei Töchter ("The Tale of Three Daughters"), an old man loses his wife and remarries. His new spouse forces him to abandon his three daughters in the woods. He does just that; the girls fall into a hole. The youngest prays to God to give them shovels and pickaxes to excavate an exit. They dig a way out of the hole and into the king's stables, where they find food. The king's horses are getting thinner and he orders a night watch. His servants find the three maidens, the youngest promises golden-haired twins, a boy and a girl. Some time later, she bears the children, which are abandoned with a she-dog and replaced for puppies. Years later, the aunts send the twins for the jowl of a swine in the "Milchsees" and for a wife for the Brother, a "golden maiden" that lives in a mountain beyond seven mountains.

Adyghe people
In a variant from the Adyghe people with the title "Три дочери старика" ("The old man's three daughters"), first collected in the mid-19th century and published in 1872, an old man brings some apples home and his daughters want to go with him the next time he picks up fruits. The man goes to the woods, digs up a hole nwar an apple tree and covers it with a carpet. He lures his daughters to the hole, they fall into it and he abandons them there. The three girls pray to God to save them and to provide them with food. With God's help, they climb out the hole and take shelter atop a tree. The khan passes by the forest and finds the three girls on the tree. He then inquires about their skills: the eldest says she can sew clothes for his army in one day; the middle one that she can sew clothes for 50 horsemen, and the youngest saying she will bear twins (a boy and a girl), both with a half of white gold and a half of yellow gold. The khan chooses the youngest as his wife. She gives birth to her twins, who are taken by her jealous sisters and cast in a box. The box with the children wash ashore and is found by a lady of the river, who raises the twins by the river bank, while their biological mother, as punishment, is tied to the khan's palace's gates. An old woman passes by the disgraced queen and asks for some flour, and bakes two cakes with her breastmilk. The old woman goes to the river bank and gives the children the cakes. They taste it; the boy recognizes their mother's milk, while the girl complains that hers was baked with water. They tell their adoptive mother the event and she says she has to let them go into the world. The boy then builds a house for him and his sister. A passing old man convinces the female twin to find them a dove and a maiden named Ayrish-Ayrishakan. The Brother gets the bird, but becomes stone due to the maiden's powers, and is rescued by his Sister.

Ingush people
In a tale from the Ingush people, collected in 1963 with the title "Мальчик с солнцем во лбу и месяцем между лопаток" ("The Boy with the Sun in his Mouth and the Moon between his shoulders"), a man remarries. His new wife wants him to get rid of his three daughters, so he abandons them in the woods under the pretence of picking up apples. The girls climb a tree to shelter themselves. A prince passes by with his retinue and finds them. He then inquires them about their skills: the oldest says she can weave clothes for 60 men in one night; the middle sister says she can cook a meal for 60 men with the quantity of wheat in a copper thimble, and the youngest that she can bear a son with a shining sun on the front and a moon between the shoulders. The prince marries the youngest sister and she gives birth to a boy just as she described. The boy is cast in the water by his aunts, but is saved and grows up. He is then sent to tame a red stallion, [wild] like a tiger, and to bring back a girl who can petrify people.

Abaza people
In a tale from the Abaza people, collected from a 48-year-old teller with the title "Златоволосая и Среброволосый" ("Goldenhair and Silverhair"), an old man has three daughters. He remarries, and his new wife orders him to get rid of the girls, else she will leave him. He leads the girls to the forest under the pretense of picking pears, and abandons them in a hole. The girls manage to excavate an exit through the walls of the hole and find a cellar that belongs to the khan. The king notices some food missing and discovers the girls. The khan inquires them about their skills: the eldest boasts that she can sew clothes for a hundred people in a day; the middle one that she can feed a hundred people in a day, the youngest promises to bear him twins, a girl with golden hair and a boy with silver hair. The khan marries the youngest sister and she gives birth to her children. The jealous elder sisters replace the twins with puppies and throws them into the sea in a barrel, while the khan orders his wife to be sewn in a bull's hide and banished to the crossroads with her puppies. The children break free of the barrel and build a house by the shore. One day, the khan meets the silver-haired twin when going to the mosque. The jealous aunts, knowing that their deceit may be discovered, send a messenger to the twins' house. While the silver-haired brother goes hunting, the golden-haired sister stays at home. The messenger tell her about the shining golden comb of the maiden Dshakhyaki, her mirror that can see everyhing its owner wishes to see in it, and her golden apple. The brother obtains the items, then goes for Dshakhyaki herself. With the mirror, the golden-haired girl sees her mother abandoned in a road with the two puppies, and feels sorry for them; their golden apple frutifies into a garden of golden apple trees. The Brother turns to stone when facing Dshakhyaki, and his sister rescues him. The maiden marries the Brother and reveals the truth to the king and the entire court at her wedding.

Balkar people
In a tale from the Balkars with the Balkar title "Бир кишини юц къызы" (Bir kiṡini üc qızı; Russian: "Три дочери одного человека"; German: Die drei Töchter eines Mannes, English: "Three Daughters of One Man"), a father loses his wife, but remarries a woman that mistreats his three daughters. One day, he comes back from the woods with some pears and apples to feed them, and they tell him they wish to join him next time. The next day, he prepares a trap for his daughters: he digs up a hole near an apple tree and covers it with some branches; he draws the girls to the hole and they fall inside. The man abandons the girls in the hole and returns home. The three girls escape from the hole by using a pickaxe their father forgot there. They climb out of the hole and live in woods, gathering fruits form themselves and climbing up trees to rest. The khan's retinue passes by the same tree one night and the youngest girl climbs down the tree and mends the torn garments from the khan's retinue. The next day, the retinue notice their mended clothes and think that the tree brought luck for them. After two nights of this, a night guard discovers the girls and reports the finding to the khan. The khan asks them about their skills: the eldest promises that she can make garments for her husband and his friends on the same night they return form a hunt; the middle one that she can prepare food in a single night that will feed them during a whole hunt; and the youngest promises to bear twins like the world has never seen. The khan marries all three women, and before he goes on a hunt, orders his wives to fulfill their boasts. The youngest wife gives birth to a boy and a girl, who are replaced for puppies and thrown in the sea by the jealous sisters. Learning of this, the khan orders his third wife to be banished with the puppies to the deepest part of the woods. The twins survive and are adopted by an old couple. The boy becomes a fine hunter. However, their adoptive parents suggest they move out to a nearby house, but to keep visiting them. So, the twins build a hut for themselves with animal hides and live in the forest. One night, the fire is put out, and the female twin goes to a neighbour's house to borrow some coals for her fire, and meets two women - her aunts. The aunts notice that the girl is their niece. The next day, while the male twin is on a hunt, they visit the twins' house and tells about a lake whose water, if sprinkled on four trees, will create a house of gold and precious gems. The brother gets the water and sprinkles on their humble hut and a palace appears overnight. The next time, the aunts visit her to tell the girl about a magical furcoat: its lapels play the fiddle; its sleeves applaud to a rhythm, and its coattails dance. The third object is a magic mirror from somewhere that shows the world. Lastly, the aunts send the twins for a maiden with golden hair and silver teeth as a wife for the male twin. The brother rides his horse to the maiden's tower and is petrified. The sister sees her brother in the mirror, dresses in man's clothes and rides a horse to the maiden's tower to rescue her brother and bring the maiden back with them. Some time later, the brother goes on a hunt and ventures deep in the woods. He sees two dogs run behind a tree. He follows the animals and finds its master: a person that looked like an animal. He brings the person with him and feeds them with bonemarrow; after some time, the person regains some semblance of humanity: it is their mother. One day, the twins' father, the khan, announces he will make a parade, and orders his two elder wives to prepare food and garments. A woman in the crowd tells him about a beautiful maiden that lives with a pair of twins that live nearby, and he agrees to invite her. The maiden goes to the khan's palace and joins the other women in telling stories. She begins her tale from the beginning: the father who remarried; the abandonment of his daughters; the khan in the forest; the promises of the three sisters; the birth of the twins. The khan notices it is the story of his wife's family. The maiden takes the khan to the twins' palace and meets his children and wife.

Iran
Researcher Adrienne Boulvin translated into French an Iranian tale from Tapas. In this tale, titled Molla Badji, a trader has three daughters that go to Quranic school. Their teacher, named Mollâ Bâdji, has a daughter named Fâtme, who appears each day with a new garment. The sisters ask Mollâ Bâdji how Fâtme looks good every day, and the teacher suggests that the girls' mother is neglecting them, so they just have to get rid of her by drowning her in the vinegar jar. The girls follow their teacher's advice. Time passes, and the girls talk to their father about remarrying, and suggest their teacher, Mollâ Bâdji, as his new wife. The wedding is celebrated, and, on the wedding night, Mollâ Bâdji orders her husband to abandon his daughters in the desert, away from the village. The trader is reluctant at first, but agrees to take the girls to the desert under a false pretext of visiting their aunt. They leave the next morning and pass by a garden. The father blindfolds the girls and explains he will gather nuts for them, but has to protect their eyes from the shards that may escape and blind their eyes. The father snaps a tree branch to further the ruse, but flees and leaves the girls there. The three sisters take off their blindfolds and notice their father abandoned them there in the wilderness.

Some time later, the girls begin to feel hungry and plan to eat their cadette. She dissuades them by saying that they may eat her to sate their hunger, but the next day they will still be hungry, so she offers to go out. The third sister manages to find a brick wall and discover an underground path that leads to a palace. She goes back to her sisters and take them to the palace, where they spend the next months. One day, a king and his son are riding along the path, and overhear the three sisters' conversation about marrying a king: the elder sister promises to weave a carpet so large to accommodate the dignitaries of the whole kingdom, and half will still be unseated; the middle sister that with only an eggshell she can cook a dish to feed the whole army, and there would still be food left; and the cadette promises to bear the king twins, a girl with golden hair and a boy with teeth of pearl.

The king and his son decide to summon the girls to their presence, and announce that the prince shall marry the elder sister, and she has to prove her claim. The elder fails to weave their carpet, and is thrown in prison. The king's son marries the second sister and orders her to prepare the food. The middle sister also fails and is thrown in prison. He finally marries the third sister and threatens to kill her if she cannot fulfill her promise. However, by the end of nine months, she gives birth to twins: a daughter with golden hair and a son with teeth of pearl. The elder sisters, jealous of the youngest success, bribe an old matchmaker to get the twins and cast them in the water in a box, and put two puppies in their place. The matchmaker follows the deadly plan; the king's son orders his wife to be cast in prison and buried in hot sand.

As for the twins, the box washes ashore on a beach near a hermitage. A hermit finds the twins and a gazelle suckles them, thinking them to be its young. The gazelle nurses the babies and the hermit names the boy Mohammed and the girl Zari. After seven years, on his deathbed, the hermit predicts that a white horse will come out of the sea to help them, and they must never part with it. The white horse appears, and they ride it to the land of their parents. The twins build a large house for them and live here for years. Their aunts notice the twins are their nephews, and send the matchmaker to pay them a visit. The matchmaker compliments their home, but tells Zari about the tree of laughing flowers. Zari tells her brother Mohammed that she wants it for their garden.

Mohammed and the white horse go to the garden of fairies to find the tree and bring it home. Next, the matchmaker tells Zari about the marvellous robe, which is also found by the male twin. Lastly, the matchmaker sends them after the daughter of the king of the fairies. Mohammed rides the horse to the palace of the fairy king, steals the princess and takes her with him. Mohammed marries the fairy princess and reveals the truth of their origin.

The king invites the twins and the fairy princess for a banquet at the palace. During the dinner, a magpie perches near the tablecloth. The twins interact with the magpie. The king is surprised by their behaviour and asks if the bird can understand them, to which the fairy princess asks if a woman can bear animals. The king realizes the twins are their children, takes off his wife from her cell, and punishes his sisters-in-law.

Tatar people
Author James Riordan translated a tale from the Tatar people with the title Altynchech and the Padishah's Wife. In this tale, a man has a wife and three daughters. The man's wife dies and he remarries. His second wife orders him to get rid of his daughters. The man digs out a hole in the forest, covers it and draws his daughters to the trap by telling them they will gather berries. He guides them to an apple tree and the girls walk over the hole and fall into it. The man abandons the trio there and goes back home. The girls stay in the hole for days, and survive by eating apples, until the tree has no more fruits. After a while, the youngest orders her sisters to climb on top of each other, so she can leave the hole and look for help. The youngest daughter climbs out of the hole and happens to find a padishah's hunting party. The padishah orders the other girls to be rescued from the hole and inquires each one about their skills: the eldest promises to sew clothes for the entire army with a single thread of linen; the middle one promises to feed the entire army with a single loaf of bread, and the youngest promises she will give birth to a boy and a girl "fairer than the sky at dawn". The elder sisters fulfill their boasts, but the padishah chooses the youngest sister as his wife. Spurred by envy of their cadette's good fortune, they conspire to replace her: while the padishah is away at war, she gives birth to her promised twins, which the sisters replace for two black skunks and take to the forest to a hermit woman's hut. The padishah returns from war and, finding out about his "children", orders his wife to be banished to a hut and to be spat on by the people. Meanwhile, the twins are raised by the hermit woman in her hut, the boy becoming a skilled hunter that brings home animal furs for his sister. The twins' jealous aunts go to the hermit woman's hut and forces her to cast a spell on the female twin, so she may desire impossible things: first, the wild black stallion; second, the milky lake where the golden duck swims with her ducklings; lastly, for a golden-haired maiden named Altynchech, who lives beyond the Mountains of Heaven. The male twin rides the stallion he tamed to Altynchech's palace and shouts for her to come out, warned by the horse of her patrifying powers. After three shouts, the palace crumbles and the maiden comes with him to his house. During a hunt, the padishah sees the boy showing his great hunting prowess and comments with his sisters-in-law, who fear they will be discovered. The male twin falls in love with Altynchech, who agrees to marry him after he avenges his mother's shame. The boy asks the maiden about their mother, and she reveals the whole truth to the twins.

Kumyk people 
In a variant from the Kumyks, collected in Dagestan with the Kumyk title "Къарачач", a widowed old man sets a test before he remarries: he will only marry if a pair of leather boots rot under the roof. A neighbour woman finds the boots and accelarates their decay, to allow her to marry him. Time passes; she begins to despise her three step-daughters, and orders her husband to get rid of them in the woods. The man digs up a hole next to a tree and draws his daughters there; they fall in the hole, and their father abandons them. The girls manage to excavate an exit to the king's stables, where they live on the horses' ration. The king discovers them and inquires about their abilities: the elder girl claims she can sew garments for 40 men, the middle one that she can cook a large meal only with a handful of rice in an eggshell, and the youngest that she will bear him twins, a boy with golden curls and a girl with the moon on the forehead. The elder two fail to deliver, but their sister is pregnant with the twins. Spurred by envy, they take the twins, cast them in the water in a box and replace them for puppies. The twins are saved by a fisherman named Dazhanhuvat, and are given the names Suvsar (the girl) and Tabuldu (the boy). Years later, the twins' aunts send them for the branch of a magical tree, some water from a magical fountain, and finally for Karachach herself, a maiden with petrifying powers.

Footnotes

References

Further reading
 Курдованидзе, Т. Д. "К вопросу об этническом и интерэтническом в грузинской волшебной сказке (на примере типа AT 707)". Труды Тбилисского госуниверситета. Т. 191, 1977, pp. 95—106.

Georgian folklore
Fictional kings
Fictional queens
Twins in fiction
Fictional twins
Child abandonment
Adoption forms and related practices
Adoption, fostering, orphan care and displacement
ATU 700-749